Denizli is an industrial city in the southwestern part of Turkey and the eastern end of the alluvial valley formed by the river Büyük Menderes, where the plain reaches an elevation of about . Denizli is located in the country's Aegean Region.

The city has a population of about 646,278 (2018 census). This is a jump from 389,000 in 2007, due to the merger of 13 municipalities and 10 villages when the area under Denizli Municipality jurisdiction increased almost fivefold and the population around 50 percent. Denizli (Municipality) is the capital city of Denizli Province.

Denizli has seen economic development in the last few decades, mostly due to textile production and exports.

Recently, Denizli became a major domestic tourism destination due to the various types of thermal waters in Sarayköy, Central/Denizli (where Karahayıt and Pamukkale towns are located), Akköy (Gölemezli), Buldan (Yenicekent), and Çardak districts.

The ancient ruined city of Hierapolis, as well as ruins of the city of Laodicea on the Lycus, the ancient metropolis of Phrygia, are nearby.

The weather is hot in Denizli in summers, whereas in winters, it may occasionally be very cold with snow on the mountains that surround the city. Some years, snow can be observed in the urban areas. Springs and autumns are rainy, with a mild warm climate.

Name
The word deniz means 'sea, large lake'. No sea or lake can be found near Denizli. However, the original Turkish name for the place was Tonguzlu, pronounced as toŋuzlu or doŋuzlu, later donuzlu (from toŋuz 'wild boar'). Thus Tonguzlu means a 'place where boars dwell'. Because of the phonetical process (t->d, ŋ->n), the name was changed into denizlü or denizli, similar in pronunciation but different in meaning, in order to avoid the connotation 'boar, pig', which is considered offensive in Islam. Ibn Battuta recorded that the city was called Dun Ghuzluh. The latter is said to mean 'the town of the swine'.

History

In antiquity, it was an important Greek town, called Attouda (Αττούδα), that existed through the ancient Greek and Roman eras; it was near the cities (Hierapolis and Laodicea on the Lycus) and flourished through the Byzantine period.

The city was conquered by the Seljuk Turks. The inhabitants of Laodicea were also resettled here in the Seljuk period.

Ibn Battuta visited the city, noting that "In it there are seven mosques for the observance of Friday prayers, and it has splendid gardens, perennial streams, and gushing springs.  Most of the artisans there are Greek women, for in it are many Greeks who are subject to the Turks and who pay dues to the sultan, including the jizya, and other taxes."

In the 17th century, the Ottoman traveller Evliya Çelebi visited Denizli and recorded the town as follows: "The city is called by Turks as (Denizli) (which means has abundant of water sources like sea in Turkish) as there are several rivers and lakes around it. In fact it is a four-day trip from the sea. Its fortress is of square shape built on flat ground. It has no ditches. Its periphery is 470 steps long. It has four gates. These are: painters gate in North, saddle-makers gate in the East, new Mosque gate in the South, and vineyard gate in the West. There are some fifty armed watchmen in the fortress, and they attend the shop. The main city is outside the fortress with 44 districts and 3600 houses. There are 57 small and large mosques and district masjids, 7 madrasahs, 7 children's schools, 6 baths and 17 dervish lodges. As everybody lives in vineyards the upper classes and ordinary people do not flee from each other."

The city lived in peace for centuries without being involved in wars in a direct manner. The most widespread symbols of Denizli province are of textile industry.

Climate
Denizli has a Mediterranean climate (Köppen: Csa or Trewartha: Cs), with hot, dry summers and mild to cool, rainy winters. The inland areas, like Çardak, Bozkurt, Çivril, and Çal districts/counties of the province are cooler and have a higher elevation than the seaside, western part of the Province. Therefore, there are climatic differences within the province and even in the Denizli urbanized area. The land is open to winds coming from the Aegean Sea as the mountains are perpendicular to the coastline.

Denizli today

Economy

During World War I, Denizli mined chromium.

Transportation
Denizli Çardak Airport is about 45 minutes drive from the city center.

The extension of İzmir-Aydın highway to Denizli has been announced for several years. Initial infrastructure was laid in Aydın, but the rest is still forthcoming. The present Aydın-Denizli road, has a very high level of traffic, especially trucks, with each town along the road possessing its own industrial zone.

Places of interest
The city was established by Seleucid King, Antiochus II in honor of his wife, Laodice. This trading city was famous for its woolen and cotton cloths. A letter written by a Laodecian says: "I am happy. I have fortune and I am not in need of anything." Following a large earthquake which destroyed the city, what remains of the ancient city are one of the seven churches of Asia Minor, the stadium, the amphitheatre and the odeon, the cistern and the aqueduct. (see further Laodicean Church)
 Hierapolis and Pamukkale World Heritage Sites - north of Denizli Pamukkale traventines. The city of Hierapolis was founded by the Pergamon King Eumenes II in 190 BC. Its closeness to Laodicea led to commercial and military rivalry. The town was built in Greek style. Despite suffering a violent earthquake in 17 AD, it reached its peak during the Roman and Byzantine periods.  It was reconstructed during the 2nd and 3rd centuries in stone from quarries in the area, in a Roman style. The town had its most glorious years during the reign of Roman Emperors Septimius Severus and Caracalla and became an episcopal seat during the expansion of Christianity. However, as a result of several earthquakes, the most violent of which was in 1354, a great part of the town was destroyed, and its people migrated.
It was recently restored along with the Ottoman konaks nearby and is set to become a visitor's attraction by its own right.
 Honaz mountain is a popular picnic excursion for Denizli's people in summer.
 The nearby village of Goncalı, which is on the railway line, is another excursion. People come to eat the charcoal-grilled thinly-cut kebab called çöp şiş, preferably with the local süzme yoghurt and a glass of rakı.
 There is a statue of Atatürk at Çınar Meydanı in the city centre.
 Servergazi türbesi is located near to the Yenişehir neighborhood. The tomb of the 12th century Turkish commander of the Seljuk akıncı unit is located there. Many locals visit and pray at the tomb especially on weekends.
 Teraspark Shopping and Lifestyle Center, Teraspark AVM, located in Yenişehir. Teraspark AVM is the biggest shopping center in Denizli.
 Forum Çamlık Shopping and Lifestyle Center, Forum Çamlık AVM, located in the heart of the city centre, Demokrasi Meydanı/Square and surrounded by residential areas, welcomes more than 450,000 people within a catchment area of 20 minutes. The design of Forum Çamlık was inspired by the rich architectural elements that are unique to Province of Denizli. Local stones like Denizli travertine and marble are used for the cladding of many buildings.

Administration

List of districts and 2021 census.

Notable people

Ancient sites of Denizli 
 Laodikeia
 Hierapolis
 Trapezopolis

International relations

Twin towns — sister cities
Denizli is twinned with:

See also

 Merkezefendi

References

External links

 
Cities in Turkey
Districts of Denizli Province
Populated places in Denizli Province